Kwame Geathers (born October 4, 1990) is an American football nose tackle who is currently a free agent. He played college football at Georgia.

College career
Geathers entered the 2013 NFL Draft after his junior season.

Professional career

2013 NFL Draft

San Diego Chargers
Geathers was signed by the San Diego Chargers on May 13, 2013. He was waived by the Chargers on December 2, 2014.

Cincinnati Bengals
On December 12, 2014, Geathers was signed to the Cincinnati Bengals' practice squad. On August 31, 2015, he was released by the Bengals.

Personal life
Geathers brothers Robert and Clifton play in the NFL. His father Robert Geathers, Sr., uncle Jumpy Geathers and cousin Jeremy Geathers also played in the NFL.

References

External links
San Diego Chargers bio
Georgia Bulldogs bio

1990 births
Living people
People from Georgetown, South Carolina
Players of American football from South Carolina
American football defensive tackles
Georgia Bulldogs football players
San Diego Chargers players
Cincinnati Bengals players
Geathers family